Cyrestis nais is a butterfly of the family Nymphalidae. It is found in Indonesia.

Subspecies
C. n. nais Timor
C. n. naisina Fruhstorfer, 1898 Lombok
C. n. pallida Martin, 1903 Sumba

References

Cyrestinae
Butterflies described in 1869